Veth (or Vethi or Vetti-chakiri, from Sanskrit visti), also known as Begar (from Persian), was a system of forced labour practised in the Indian subcontinent, in which members of populace were compelled to perform unpaid work for the government.

In the Maratha Confederacy, Veth-begar was practised on a wide scale during the Peshwa's rule. Certain groups of people, such as Brahmins, Kayasthas, Marathas and Kasars (brass-workers) of Saswad region, were exempted from veth-begar.

The system continued to be practised in the princely states during the British Raj. For example, in the Mewar State, peasants (including those from the upper-caste) were forced to engage in begar. As part of veth, the peasants and low-caste people were forced to supply water to the ruler's family; construct buildings, roads, and dams; and carry dead and wounded soldiers. The British government exempted Christians from veth-begar.

See also 
 Jajmani system

References

Economy of British India
Debt bondage in India